Michael Cole (born July 3, 1940) is an American actor. He is best known for his role as Pete Cochran on the television crime drama The Mod Squad (1968–1973).

Career 
Cole has appeared in numerous films and TV shows, beginning in 1961 with a role in the film drama, Forbid Them Not. Other film credits include the role of Mark in the 1966 science fiction film, The Bubble, later re-titled Fantastic Invasion of Planet Earth, Spivey in the western Chuka (1967), Alan Miller in The Last Child (1971), which was nominated for a Golden Globe Award, and as Cliff Norris in Beg, Borrow or Steal (1973). He did a great deal of stage work after The Mod Squad went off the air, such as Cat on a Hot Tin Roof.

Cole has also appeared on Gunsmoke, in 1966, as Kipp. During the 1970s, he had many guest appearances on Wonder Woman, The Love Boat and CHiPs, and appeared in the made-for-TV thriller Evening in Byzantium in 1978. In the 1980s and 1990s, he worked on Nickel Mountain. He also worked on shows such as The Eddie Capra Mysteries, Murder, She Wrote, Fantasy Island, and Diagnosis: Murder. Later, Cole appeared as adult Henry Bowers in Stephen King's 1990 two-part TV miniseries It. In 1991, he joined the cast of General Hospital in the role of Harlan Barrett.

But it was his role as Pete Cochran, a troubled youth turned crime fighter in The Mod Squad (1968–1973), that made Cole an international celebrity. Cole's boyish good looks and brooding, deep-voiced personality meshed perfectly with his character's backstory—a ne'er-do-well son of wealthy parents who had evicted him from their home after he had stolen a car. Produced by Aaron Spelling and Danny Thomas, The Mod Squad resonated with counterculture-era viewers and ran for five seasons, during which a total of 123 episodes were produced.

According to TVGuide.com, Cole originally balked at the part of Peter Cochran when he realized he would be playing an undercover cop, saying "I'm not going to take the part of a guy who finks on his friends!" He changed his mind, however, when he read the script and gathered the show's potential appeal.

Cole went through treatment in the Betty Ford Clinic in the early 1990s to get his drinking problem under control.

Cole continues to act in various film and television projects, and played the character Charles Hadley in a 2006 episode of the television series ER. Also in 2006, Cole played opposite Clarence Williams III in Mystery Woman: At First Sight, an episode of the Mystery Woman film series that aired on the Hallmark Channel. Cole later made an appearance in the 2007 thriller Mr. Brooks as the attorney for Demi Moore's character of Detective Tracy Atwood.

Personal life 
He was married three times and divorced twice. He has two children from his first marriage, and a daughter from the second marriage. Cole has been married to Shelley Funes since 1996.

Filmography 
Gunsmoke (1966, TV) as Kipp
The Bubble (1966) as Mark
Chuka (1967) as Spivey
The Mod Squad (1968–1973, TV) as Pete Cochran
The Last Child (1971, TV Movie) as Alan Miller
Police Story (1973 TV series) (1975, TV) as Det. Lew Reeves in "The Witness"
Wonder Woman (1978, TV) as Ted
The Love Boat (1979, TV) as Mike Kelly
The Return of Mod Squad (1979, TV Movie) as Pete Cochrane
CHiPs (1979–1981, TV) as himself/Tom Gibson
Beyond Westworld (1980. TV) as Corey Burns
Fantasy Island (1981, TV) as Falco
Nickel Mountain (1984) as Henry Soames
Murder, She Wrote (1987–1990, TV) as Earl Tuchman/Lt. John Meyerling
It: Part 2  (1990, TV) as Henry Bowers
Diagnosis: Murder (1996, TV) as Senator Terrence Bell
ER (2006, TV) as Charles Hadley
Mr. Brooks (2007) as Atwood's Lawyer
Grave Misconduct (2008, TV Movie) as Jason Connelly

References

External links 
 

1940 births
20th-century American male actors
21st-century American male actors
Actors from Madison, Wisconsin
American male film actors
American male television actors
Male actors from Wisconsin
Living people